thumb
thumb

Lance Serrano (born May 22, 1992, in Mandaluyong, Philippines), better known as Lance Serrano, is a Filipino actor, commercial model and basketball player, Serrano has multiple TV shows on GMA Network.

Career
After graduating and receiving his professional license as a Nurse in the Philippines Lance Serrano became part of ABS-CBN before he appeared on its rival network GMA. Serrano was on contract at Star Magic (2009) then transferred to GMA Artist Center in 2013. He's known for his role as Steve in Galema: Anak ni Zuma . He's a commercial model, appearing in Emperador Light, Judge, Smart, Globe, Yamaha Jollibee and countless other TV and Digital commercials. He was also part of Demigod for hunk modeling, BENCH uncut , BENCH Universe, COSMO BACHELORS, Philippine Fasion Week. His first guesting at a talk show was in The Ryzza Mae Show appearing alongside best child host for 2013 Ryzza Mae Dizon. He was also included in the Telefantasya series, Encantadia alongside on-screen partner "Gabbi Garcia" , wherein he played the Adamyan Memfes who was the loveteam of Alena. He also played for 2 years in the PBA D League in teams such as AMA Online Education Titans where he scored 13 points in the 4th quarter and Hazchem Green for 2 years and 3 seasons.

Television

TV Commercials / Basketball Career
 Emperador Light
 Judge (Chewing Gum)
 Jollibee
 Uratex Monoblock
 AMA TITANS
 HAZCHEM

References

1990 births
Living people
People from Mandaluyong
Male actors from Metro Manila
Filipino male television actors
Filipino male models
GMA Network personalities